Potenza (italian for "Power") may also refer to:

Places
Italy
Potenza, a town in southern Italy
Province of Potenza, a province of Basilicata
Potenza Picena, a comune in the Province of Macerata, Marche
Porto Potenza Picena, a civil parish of Potenza Picena, Marche
Vietri di Potenza, a town and comune in the Province of Potenza, Basilicata
Potentia (ancient city)

Geographical features
Potenza (river), a river in Marche, Italy

People
Alessandro Potenza (1984 - ), an Italian football player
Christian Potenza (1972 - ), a Canadian actor
Frank Potenza (1933 - 2011), an American police officer associated with Jimmy Kimmel Live!
Frank Potenza (guitarist) (1950 -), an American jazz guitarist
Gianmaria Potenza (1936 -), Italian artist
Marc Potenza (1965 - ), an American psychiatrist

Automotive
Potenza Sports Cars, owners of British car manufacturers Westfield Sportscars and GTM Cars
Bridgestone Potenza, a line of performance tires manufactured by Bridgestone